In graph theory, a circulant graph is an undirected graph acted on by a cyclic group of symmetries which takes any vertex to any other vertex. It is sometimes called a cyclic graph, but this term has other meanings.

Equivalent definitions
Circulant graphs can be described in several equivalent ways:
The automorphism group of the graph includes a cyclic subgroup that acts transitively on the graph's vertices. In other words, the graph has a graph automorphism, which is a cyclic permutation of its vertices.
The graph has an adjacency matrix that is a circulant matrix.
The graph can be drawn (possibly with crossings) so that its vertices lie on the corners of a regular polygon, and every rotational symmetry of the polygon is also a symmetry of the drawing.
The graph is a Cayley graph of a cyclic group.

Examples
Every cycle graph is a circulant graph, as is every crown graph with  vertices.

Since the presence or absence of an edge depends only on the difference modulo  of two vertex numbers, any Paley graph is a circulant graph.

Every Möbius ladder is a circulant graph, as is every complete graph. A complete bipartite graph is a circulant graph if it has the same number of vertices on both sides of its bipartition.

This is because its symmetries include as a subgroup the cyclic group Cmn  Cm×Cn. More generally, in this case, the tensor product of graphs between any - and -vertex circulants is itself a circulant.

Many of the known lower bounds on Ramsey numbers come from examples of circulant graphs that have small maximum cliques and small maximum independent sets.

A specific example 

The circulant graph  with jumps  is defined as the graph with  nodes labeled  where each node i is adjacent to 2k nodes .

 The graph  is connected if and only if .
 If  are fixed integers then the number of spanning trees  where  satisfies a recurrence relation of order . 
 In particular,  where  is the n-th Fibonacci number.

Self-complementary circulants
A self-complementary graph is a graph in which replacing every edge by a non-edge and vice versa produces an isomorphic graph.
For instance, a five-vertex cycle graph is self-complementary, and is also a circulant graph. More generally every Paley graph of prime order is a self-complementary circulant graph. He conjectured that this condition is also necessary: that no other values of  allow a self-complementary circulant to exist. The conjecture was proven some 40 years later, by Vilfred.

Ádám's conjecture
Equivalently, a circulant numbering is a numbering of the vertices for which the adjacency matrix of the graph is a circulant matrix.

Then the linear function that takes a number  to  transforms a circulant numbering to another circulant numbering. However, Ádám's conjecture is now known to be false. These two graphs are isomorphic, but their isomorphism cannot be realized by a linear map.

Toida's conjecture refines Ádám's conjecture by considering only a special class of circulant graphs, in which all of the differences between adjacent graph vertices are relatively prime to the number of vertices. According to this refined conjecture, these special circulant graphs should have the property that all of their symmetries come from symmetries of the underlying additive group of numbers modulo . It was proven by two groups in 2001 and 2002.

Algorithmic questions
There is a polynomial-time recognition algorithm for circulant graphs, and the isomorphism problem for circulant graphs can be solved in polynomial time.

References

External links

Graph families
Regular graphs